Evans is an unincorporated community in western Jackson County, West Virginia, United States.  It lies along West Virginia Route 87 west of the city of Ripley, the county seat of Jackson County.  Its elevation is 594 feet (181 m).  Although Evans is unincorporated, it has a post office, with the ZIP code of 25241. Evans is home to 20 businesses that employ 70 individuals.

Demographics 
According to the 2010 U.S. Census, the population of Evans is 1,710, including 867 males and 843 females.  The racial make-up of the town is 99.41% White, 0.11% African American, 0.23% Hispanic, 0.52% Asian, and 0.11% other races. There are 678 households located in Evans with 2.52 persons per household.

Public Education 
Evans Elementary School is the only public school in Evans. Their mascot is the Bears, and it serves grades PK-5 in the Jackson County School district. The school is a West Virginia School of Excellence, a West Virginia High Performing and High Progress School, and was awarded as a National Title I Distinguished School. It was also named a National Blue Ribbon School in 2015 and 2022.

The school is currently ranked as the #1 elementary school in West Virginia by U.S. News.

Community Organizations

Evans Community Initiative 
Since 1994, Evans Community Initiative, Inc. (ECI) has contributed to improving Evans, West Virginia. As a non-profit organization, ECI strives to make Evans the very best family-oriented community all residents can continue to be proud of and enjoy. ECI is dedicated to creating a safe and beautiful environment for local families and for the next generation of families to come.
From building a walking track and outdoor classroom located next to Evans Elementary, to providing support to bring new outdoor toys and recreational areas to the school's playground, ECI continues to impact lives throughout the community.

Notable people 
 Jessica Wedge - 2006 Miss West Virginia USA
 David C. Hardesty Jr. - 21st President of West Virginia University

References

Unincorporated communities in Jackson County, West Virginia
Unincorporated communities in West Virginia